Dennis Trammell (born February 6, 1982) is an American former professional basketball player. He played college basketball at New Mexico University and Ball State University. At , he played shooting guard.

In 2005, he signed with Union Athletic of Uruguay but left before appearing in a game for them. In February 2006, he was tested by KK Siroki Eronet of Bosnia but was subsequently not signed. He  later signed with the Canterbury Rams of the New Zealand National Basketball League (NZNBL) for the 2006 season. He starred for the Rams, leading the league in scoring with 25.6 points per game. He excelled alongside point guard Jeremy Kench. For the 2006–07 season, Trammell played for USC Heidelberg of Germany. In 28 games, he averaged 17 ppg, 5rpg, and 2.2apg.

References

External links
Profile at Eurobasket.com
RealGM.com Profile

1982 births
Living people
American expatriate basketball people in Croatia
American expatriate basketball people in Germany
American expatriate basketball people in New Zealand
American expatriate basketball people in Uruguay
Ball State Cardinals men's basketball players
Basketball players from Chicago
Canterbury Rams players
George Westinghouse College Prep alumni
New Mexico State Aggies men's basketball players
Shooting guards
American men's basketball players